Aljona Malets (born 6 May 1987) is a retired Estonian football player, who last played as a defender for Naiste Meistriliiga club Pärnu JK. She has also played for FC Levadia Tallinn, taking part in the UEFA Women's Champions League with both teams. In 15 international games for Estonia women's national football team he scored one goal – on 26 of July 2008 against Lithuania in Women's Baltic Cup.

Early life
Malets was born in Tallinn. She has been connected to sports since early childhood. Before starting her football career Aljona has been involved in horse riding, kayaking and figure skating, reaching success in local competitions in those disciplines.

Career

Club career

FC Levadia Tallinn
Aljona started to play football at the age of 16. Her first club was FC Levadia Tallinn (former TKSK Visa) where she started as forward. Most notable moment of her career as an attacking player occurred in her very first season. Malets scored incredible 10 goals in one game against EVL Silwi Kehtna on matchday 8 of Naiste Meistriliiga.
In season 2009 Aljona has been moved to defence, however this did not influence on her goal scoring abilities. Malets scored at least a goal in every season she has played for FC Levadia Tallinn.

Pärnu JK
In 2012 Aljona moved to Pärnu JK. It is symbolic that her first game for new team was against FC Levadia Tallinn. In 2013 Aljona helped Pärnu JK to qualify for the Knockout-stage of UEFA Women's Champions League for the first time in the club's history.

Career statistics

International

International goals

Honours

Club
FC Levadia Tallinn
Naiste Meistriliiga: 2007, 2008, 2009
Baltic League: 2007
Estonian Women's Cup: 2009
Pärnu JK
Naiste Meistriliiga: 2012, 2013, 2014
Estonian Women's Cup: 2012, 2014
Estonian Women's Supercup : 2013, 2014

International
Woman U-19 Baltic Cup: 2006
Woman Baltic Cup: 2008, 2012, 2013

References

External links

1987 births
Living people
Estonian women's footballers
Women's association football defenders
Estonia women's international footballers
Pärnu JK players
FC Levadia Tallinn (women) players